The Armenian Table Tennis Federation, is the regulating body of table tennis in Armenia, governed by the Armenian Olympic Committee. The headquarters of the federation is located in Yerevan.

History
The Federation is currently led by president Felix Sargsyan. The Federation oversees the training of table tennis specialists. Armenian table tennis athletes participate in various European and international level table tennis competitions, including the European Championships. The Federation is a full member of the International Table Tennis Federation and the European Table Tennis Union.

See also 
 Sport in Armenia

References 

Sports governing bodies in Armenia
Table tennis
National members of the European Table Tennis Union